The Senate is the upper house of the Parliament of Cameroon.

History
The Senate was created in 1996 after an amendment to the constitution created the upper chamber. However, power to convene the Electoral College and call elections for the Senate remained with the President. President Paul Biya chose not to do so until he signed decree 2013/056 on 27 February 2013, which set 14 April as the election date.

Electoral system
The Senate has 100 seats, of which 70 are elected and 30 appointed by the President, with each region having 10 Senators. The elected seats are elected by the 10,636 members of the 360 municipal councils.

Elections to the Senate were held for the first time on 14 April 2013. Marcel Niat Njifenji was elected as President of the Senate on 12 June 2013. The President of the Senate is the constitutionally designated successor to the President of the Republic in case of a vacancy in the latter office.

Presidents of the Senate

Current members of the Senate

The Senate consists of 70 members directly elected by their regions and 30 nominated by the president of Cameroon.

References

Politics of Cameroon
Cameroon
2013 establishments in Cameroon